"Back Up" is a song recorded by American rapper Dej Loaf, featuring American rapper Big Sean. It was released by Columbia Records on July 15, 2015, as the first single from Loaf's debut EP ...And See That's the Thing (2015). The song was written by Dej Loaf, Big Sean, Clenton Gosberry and Kyle Adams; the latter also produced the song under the pseudonym iRocksays. "Back Up" contains a sample from the song "Back Up Off Me" by DJ Clent.

Music video
A music video, directed by Alex Nazari, was filmed at Detroit's Royal Skate Land. It premiered via Loaf's VEVO channel on October 5, 2015.

Commercial performance
"Back Up" debuted at number 83 on the US Billboard Hot 100 for the chart dated October 24, 2015. The song was certified Platinum by the RIAA on October 19, 2016.

Charts

Weekly charts

Year-end charts

Certifications

References

External links
 
 

2015 singles
2015 songs
Dej Loaf songs
Big Sean songs
Columbia Records singles
Songs written by Big Sean
Songs written by Dej Loaf